Lawrence Alan "Larry" Kasanoff (born June 1, 1959) is an American filmmaker who founded the Vestron Pictures genre subsidiary Lightning Pictures in 1986, Lightstorm Entertainment with James Cameron in 1990, and Threshold Entertainment in 1993.

Career
Kasanoff is known for films such as the Mortal Kombat movie franchise including the 1995 Mortal Kombat, its sequel Mortal Kombat: Annihilation and its spin-off series Mortal Kombat: Defenders of the Realm and Mortal Kombat: Conquest.  Kasanoff also served as executive producer of the 2021 reboot.  Other films produced by Kasanoff include Blood Diner, Blue Steel, True Lies, and Lego: The Adventures of Clutch Powers.

Foodfight!  

The 2012 film Foodfight!, the first and only animated feature directed by Kasanoff, featured a cast of celebrity voice actors, including Charlie Sheen, Wayne Brady, Hilary Duff, and Eva Longoria. The film revolves around brand mascots, known as "Ikes", who come to life in a supermarket after closing time, and their struggles against the forces of Brand X. Several actual corporate mascots make cameos in the movie, such as Mrs. Butterworth, Charlie the Tuna, and the California Raisins. Development for the movie began as early as 1999, but troubled production (including an incident where the hard drives had been stolen) and financial difficulties delayed its release several times. Upon the film's eventual theatrical release in 2012, it became a box-office bomb, earning just $74,000 against its reported $65 million budget. Foodfight! was also critically panned for its animation, humor, use of product placement as a central theme (and being aimed towards children), and content inappropriate for its target audience, such as sexual innuendo and references to Nazism. It subsequently garnered a reputation for being one of the worst films ever made.

A New York Times article condemned the film, saying: "The animation appears unfinished ... And the plot ... is impenetrable and even offensive." The article also reported that Foodfight! had been "seized upon by Internet purveyors of bad cinema". One such Internet critic was Nathan Rabin of The A.V. Club, who included the film in his My World of Flops column, describing it as "one of those fall-of-civilization moments" and "This is the kind of movie so unbelievably, surreally and exquisitely terrible that you want to share it with the rest of the world. I was put on earth to suffer through abominations like Foodfight! so that society as a whole might benefit from my Christ-like sacrifice." Meanwhile, a review in Esquire described it as "The Room, rendered in horribly sharp polygons" and Hollywood News called it "by far the crappiest piece of crap I have ever had the misfortune to watch". Likewise, critic Tim Brayton described it as "the absolute ugliest animated feature that has ever been released by something resembling an actual animation studio ... one of the very worst movies I have ever seen." MSN have since included Foodfight! in their worst film list. Rebecca Hawkes of The Daily Telegraph described Foodfight! as "the worst animated children's film ever made", while IndieWire, Comic Book Resources and Screen Rant have each described it as being one of the worst animated films ever made.

Filmography

Films

Television

References

External links

Living people
1959 births
Cornell University alumni
American film producers
People from Boston
Television producers from Massachusetts
Wharton School of the University of Pennsylvania alumni